Chiguy Lucau (born 4 August 1984 in Kinshasa) is a Congolese-French footballer, who currently plays for SR Colmar.

Career
He began his 1997 career with Levallois SC and joined in summer 1999 to PSG. In January 2003 was promoted to Paris Saint-Germain and played in his first professional season 3 games in the Ligue 1. After his first senior year with PSG left Lucau his club and signed for Le Mans. He played for Le Mans Union Club 72 64 games in the Ligue 1 and Ligue 2 before signed for CS Sedan Ardennes in summer 2007. Lucau joined than on 1 January 2009 on a six month loan from his club CS Sedan to LB Châteauroux. He played in the second half of the 2008/2009 season only four games for LB Châteauroux in the Ligue 2 and returned to CS Sedan Ardennes. After his return played for his club CS Sedan Ardennes just 3 games and was in summer 2010 released from his club. On 28 October 2010 after three months as Free agent signed a one year contract with SR Colmar.

Notes

1984 births
Living people
Footballers from Kinshasa
Democratic Republic of the Congo footballers
Democratic Republic of the Congo international footballers
Association football forwards
French footballers
Democratic Republic of the Congo emigrants to France
Le Mans FC players
Paris Saint-Germain F.C. players
CS Sedan Ardennes players
LB Châteauroux players
Ligue 1 players
Ligue 2 players